The Yamanashi Queenbees are a basketball team based in Kai, Yamanashi, playing in the Women's Japan Basketball League.

Notable players

Monami Nakajima

Venues
Kofu General Civic Center
Fuji Hokuroku Park

References

External links
 Official website

Basketball teams in Japan
Basketball teams established in 1968
1968 establishments in Japan